Chilliwack is a city in British Columbia, Canada, it may also refer to:.

Chilliwack may also refer to:

Music
 Chilliwack (band), a Canadian rock band
 Chilliwack (1970 album)
 Chilliwack (1971 album)

Places
 Chilliwhack (electoral district), a provincial electoral district from 1903 to 1912
 Chilliwack Lake Provincial Park, a provincial park located around the lake
 Chilliwack Lake, a lake in British Columbia, Canada and Washington, United States
 Chilliwack Mountain, a mountain in the city of Chilliwack
 Chilliwack River, a river in British Columbia, Canada and Washington, United States
 CFB Chilliwack, a former Canadian Forces Base in Chilliwack

Sports
 Chilliwack Bruins, a former junior ice hockey team
 Chilliwack Chiefs, a junior ice hockey team

Other
  First Nations peoples formerly known as the Chilliwack Indians and Chilliwack Indian Band, see Sto:lo